The Asian koel (Eudynamys scolopaceus) is a member of the cuckoo order of birds, the Cuculiformes. It is found in the Indian Subcontinent, China, and Southeast Asia. It forms a superspecies with the closely related black-billed koels, and Pacific koels which are sometimes treated as subspecies. The Asian koel like many of its related cuckoo kin is a brood parasite that lays its eggs in the nests of crows and other hosts, who raise its young. They are unusual among the cuckoos in being largely frugivorous as adults. The name koel is echoic in origin with several language variants.  The bird is a widely used symbol in Indian and Nepali poetry.

Taxonomy 
In 1747 the English naturalist George Edwards included an illustration and a description of the Asian koel in the second volume of his A Natural History of Uncommon Birds. He used the English name "The Brown and Spotted Indian Cuckow". Edwards based his hand-coloured etching on a specimen from Bengal that belonged to the London silk-pattern designer and naturalist Joseph Dandridge. When in 1758 the Swedish naturalist Carl Linnaeus updated his Systema Naturae for the tenth edition, he placed the Asian koel with the other cuckoos in the genus Cuculus. Linnaeus included a brief description, coined the binomial name Cuculus scolopaceus and cited Edwards' work. The Asian koel is now placed in the genus Eudynamys that was introduced in 1827 by the English naturalists Nicholas Vigors and Thomas Horsfield. The genus name Eudynamys combines the Ancient Greek eu meaning "fine" with dunamis meaning "power" or "strength". The specific epithet scolopaceus is Modern Latin meaning "snipe-like" from Latin scolopax meaning "snipe" or "woodcock".

The species has variations within its wide range with several island populations and a number of taxonomic variations have been suggested. The black-billed koel (E. melanorhynchus) of the Sulawesi region and the Pacific koel of Australasia are sometimes considered conspecific with the Asian koel in which case the "combined" species is known as the common koel. Due to differences in plumage, colour of bill and voice, the three are increasingly treated as separate species. Alternatively, only the black-billed koel has been considered as a separate species, or the Asian koel has included all subspecies otherwise included in the Pacific koel, except for the subspecies breeding in Australia, which then has the name Australian koel (E. cyanocephalus).

The Asian koel has several geographic forms that have well marked plumage differences or have been geographically isolated with little gene flow. The following is a list of named subspecies with their distributions and synonyms as given by Payne:
E. s. scolopaceus (Linnaeus, 1758) – Pakistan, India, Nepal, Bangladesh, Sri Lanka, Laccadives and Maldives
E. s. chinensis Cabanis and Heine 1863 – Southern China and Indochina, except the Thai-Malay Peninsula
E. s. harterti Ingram, C 1912 – Hainan
E. s. malayana Cabanis and Heine, 1863 – Thai-Malay Peninsula, Lesser Sundas and Greater Sundas, except Sulawesi. May include the race dolosa described from the Andaman and Nicobar Islands
E. s. mindanensis (Linnaeus, 1766) – (includes E. s. paraguena) (Hachisuka, 1934) from Palawan, and E. s. corvina (Stresemann, 1931) from Halmahera, the Philippines (including Palawan and the Babuyan Islands), islands between Mindanao and Sulawesi, and North Maluku, except the Sula Islands

Description 
 
The male of the nominate race is glossy bluish-black, with a pale greenish grey bill, the iris is crimson, and it has grey legs and feet. The female of the nominate race is brownish on the crown and has rufous streaks on the head. The back, rump and wing coverts are dark brown with white and buff spots. The underparts are whitish, but is heavily striped. The other subspecies differ in colouration and size. The upper plumage of young birds is more like that of the male and they have a black beak.
They are very vocal during the breeding season (March to August in the Indian Subcontinent), with a range of different calls. The familiar song of the male is a repeated koo-Ooo. The female makes a shrill kik-kik-kik... call. Calls vary across populations.

They show a pattern of moult that differs from those of other parasitic cuckoos. The outer primaries show a transilient (alternating) ascending moult (P9-7-5-10-8-6) while the inner primaries are moulted in stepwise descending order (1-2-3-4).(Payne citing Stresemann and Stresemann 1961)

Distribution and habitat 

The Asian koel is a bird of light woodland and cultivation. It is a mainly resident breeder in tropical southern Asia from Iran, Pakistan, India, Bangladesh and Sri Lanka to southern China and the Greater Sundas. They have great potential in colonizing new areas, and were among the pioneer birds to colonize the volcanic island of Krakatau. They first arrived in Singapore in the 1980s and became very common birds.

Some populations may make long-distance movements being found in places like Australia.

Behaviour 

The Asian koel is a brood parasite, and lays its single egg in the nests of a variety of birds, including the jungle crow, and house crow. In Sri Lanka before 1880 it was only known to parasitize the jungle crow, later shifting to the house crow. A study in India found 5% of Corvus splendens and 0.5% of Corvus macrorhynchos nests parasitized.

In Bangladesh, they parasitise long-tailed shrike (Lanius schach), common myna (Acridotheres tristis) and house crows (Corvus splendens) at about 35.7, 31.2 and 10.8% rates respectively. Host nests at low heights and nearer to fruit trees tended to be preferred by koels. In southern Thailand and the Malay Peninsula, koels have shifted host from crows to mynas (Acridotheres sp.) as the latter became more common in the late 1900s. In the Indian Subcontinent they have sometimes been found to parasitize the black drongo, the European magpie and possibly the black-headed oriole. Males may distract the hosts so that the female gets a chance to lay an egg in the nest. More often however, the female visits the nest of the host alone. The koel is not known to lay eggs in an empty host nest and a study in Pakistan found that the first koel eggs were laid, on average, within one and half days of the laying of the host's first egg. The chicks of the koel hatched about 3 days ahead of the host chicks. Koels usually lay only an egg or two in a single nest but as many as seven to eleven eggs have been reported from some host nests. A female may remove a host egg before laying. Eggs hatch in 12 to 14 days. The young koel does not always push out eggs or evict the host chicks, and initially calls like a crow. The young fledge in 20 to 28 days. Unlike some other cuckoos, the young do not attempt to kill the host chicks, a trait that is shared with the channel-billed cuckoos which are also largely frugivorous as adults. It has been suggested that koels, like some other brood parasites do not evict the host chicks due presumably due to the higher cost of evicting nestmates. A small parasite may not be able to evict large host eggs or chicks from a deep Corvid nest without risking starvation and possibly accidental self-eviction. An alternative hypothesis that retaining host chicks might benefit the koel chicks did not gain much support. Adult female parents have been known to feed young koels in the nests of the hosts, a behaviour seen in some other brood parasitic species as well. Adult males have however not been noted to feed fledglings.

The Asian koel is omnivorous, consuming a variety of insects, caterpillars, eggs and small vertebrates. Adults feed mainly on fruit. They will sometimes defend fruiting trees that they forage in and chase away other frugivores. They have been noted to be especially important in the dispersal of the sandalwood tree (Santalum album) in India. Large seeded fruits are sometimes quickly regurgitated near the parent tree while small seeded fruits are ingested and are likely to be deposited at greater distances from the parent tree. They have a large gape and are capable of swallowing large fruits including the hard fruit of palms such as Arenga and Livistona. They have been known to occasionally take eggs of small birds.

They feed on the fruits of Cascabela thevetia which are known to be toxic to mammals.

A number of parasites of the species have been described, including malaria-like protozoa, lice and nematodes.

In culture 
The word "koel" is onomatopoeic in origin. The Sanskrit name of "Kokila" and words in several Indian languages are similarly echoic. Being familiar birds with loud calls, references to them are common in folklore, myth and poetry. It is traditionally held in high regard for its song and revered in the Manusmriti, with a decree protecting them from harm. The Vedas, Sanskrit literature dated to about 2000 BC referred to it as Anya-Vapa which has been translated as "that which was raised by others" (or "sown for others to reap"). This has been interpreted as the earliest knowledge of brood parasitism.  It has been chosen as the state bird by the Indian union territory of Puducherry.

These birds were once very popular in India as cagebirds. Feeding even on boiled rice, these hardy birds lived in captivity for as long as 14 years.

References

Further reading 

 Eates, KR (1938) The status of the Koel (Eudynamys scolopaceus L.) in Sind. Journal of the Bombay Natural History Society 40(2):328.
 Jose, TV (1980) Koels. Newsletter for Birdwatchers . 20(4), 17.
 Menon, G.K.; Shah, R.V. (1979) Adaptive features in juvenal plumage pattern of the Indian Koel Eudynamys scolopacea: host mimesis and hawk-pattern. Journal of the Yamashina Institute for Ornithology 11(2):87–95
 Neelakantan, KK (1980) The breeding of the Indian Koel Eudynamys scolopacea. Newsletter for Birdwatchers . 20(1):7.
 Parasharya, BM (1985) Comments on eye color in the Koel Eudynamys scolopacea. Newsletter for Birdwatchers . 25(1–2), 11–12.
 Ray-Chaudhuri, R. (1967) Mitotic and meiotic chromosomes of the koel Eudynamys scolopacea scolopacea. Nucleus 10: 179–189. (Study notes that the W chromosome is the 6th largest one and has the centromere in a subterminal position.)
 Ryall C (2003) Mimicry of a crow chick by an Asian koel Eudynamys scolopacea as a defence against attack by house crows Corvus splendens. Journal of the Bombay Natural History Society 100(1):136–137
 Santharam, V (1979) Crows feeding young koel. Newsletter for Birdwatchers . 19(7), 4.
 Sarkar AK, Maitra SK, Midya T. (1976) Histological, histochemical and biochemical effects of cadmium chloride in female koel (Eudynamys scolopacea). Acta Histochem. 57(2):205-11.
 Sarkar AK, Maitra SK, Midya T. (1977) Effects of reserpine on female reproductive organs of the Indian koel Eudynamys scolopacea scolopacea (L). Indian Journal of Experimental Biology 15(5):349-51.

Brood parasites
Asian koel
Birds of Asia
Birds of South China
Birds of South Asia
Birds of Southeast Asia
Asian koel
Asian koel
Symbols of Jharkhand